Jesse Donald Knotts (July 21, 1924February 24, 2006) was an American actor and comedian. He is widely known for his role as Deputy Sheriff Barney Fife on The Andy Griffith Show, a 1960s sitcom for which he earned five Emmy Awards. He also played Ralph Furley on the highly rated sitcom Three's Company from 1979 to 1984. He starred in multiple comedic films, including the leading roles in The Ghost and Mr. Chicken (1966) and The Incredible Mr. Limpet (1964). In 2004, TV Guide ranked him number 27 on its 50 Greatest TV Stars of All Time list.

Knotts was born in West Virginia, the youngest of four children. In the 1940s, before earning a college degree, he served in the United States Army and in World War II. While enlisted, he chose to become a ventriloquist and comedian as part of a G.I. variety show called "Stars and Gripes".

After the army, he got his first major break on television in the soap opera Search for Tomorrow where he appeared from 1953 to 1955. He then gained wide recognition as part of the repertory company on Steve Allen's variety show, where he played the "extremely nervous man" in Allen's mock "Man in the Street" interviews. In 1958, Knotts made his film debut in the adapted version of No Time for Sergeants.

Knotts was cast as deputy Barney Fife on television's The Andy Griffith Show, which ran from 1960 to 1968. He reprised the character in other shows, such as The Joey Bishop Show and Return to Mayberry. Knotts won five Emmy Awards for Best Supporting Actor in a Television Comedy. He also appeared in the films The Ghost and Mr. Chicken (1966) and The Incredible Mr. Limpet (1964).

Early life 
Knotts was born in Morgantown, West Virginia, the youngest of four sons of farmer William Jesse Knotts and his wife Elsie Luzetta Knotts (née Moore), who were married in Spraggs, Pennsylvania. His English paternal ancestors emigrated to America in the 17th century, originally settling in Queen Anne's County, Maryland. His brothers were named Willis, William, and Ralph (who was called "Sid").

Knotts' mother was 40 at his birth. His father, who had schizophrenia and alcoholism, sometimes terrorized him with a knife, causing him to turn inward at an early age. His father died of pneumonia when Knotts was 13. He and his brothers were then raised by their mother, who ran a boarding house in Morgantown. She died in 1969 at age 84. Her son William preceded her in death in 1941 at age 31. They are buried in the family plot at Beverly Hills Memorial Park in Morgantown.

Knotts graduated from Morgantown High School. After enlisting in the United States Army and serving in World War II, he earned a bachelor's degree in education with a minor in speech from West Virginia University in Morgantown, graduating in 1948. He was a member of Phi Sigma Kappa fraternity at WVU.

Career

Early career 
Before he entered high school, Knotts began performing as a ventriloquist and comedian at various church and school functions. After high school, he traveled to New York City to try to make his way as a comedian, but when his career failed to take off, returned home to attend West Virginia University. After his freshman year, he joined the U.S. Army and spent most of his service entertaining troops. He toured the western Pacific Islands as a comedian, in a G.I. variety show called "Stars and Gripes". His ventriloquist act included a dummy named Danny, which Knotts grew to hate—and eventually threw overboard, according to friend and castmate Al Checco.

Knotts served in the army from June 21, 1943, to January 6, 1946, in the Army's 6817th Special Services Battalion. He was discharged at the rank of Technician Grade 5, then equivalent to a corporal. During his service, he was awarded the World War II Victory Medal, the Philippine Liberation Medal, the Asiatic–Pacific Campaign Medal (with four bronze service stars), the American Campaign Medal, the Army Good Conduct Medal, the Army Marksman Badge (with an M1 Carbine) and the Honorable Service Lapel Pin.

After being demobilized, Knotts returned to West Virginia University and graduated in 1948. He married Kay Metz and moved back to New York, where connections he had made in the Special Services Branch helped him break into show business. In addition to doing stand-up comedy at clubs, he appeared on radio, eventually playing the wisecracking, know-it-all character "Windy Wales" on a radio Western called "Bobby Benson and the B-Bar-B Riders".

Knotts got his first break on television in the soap opera Search for Tomorrow, where he appeared from 1953 to 1955. He came to fame in 1956 on Steve Allen's variety show, as part of Allen's repertory company, most notably in Allen's mock "Man in the Street" interviews, always playing an extremely nervous man. He remained Allen through the 1959–1960 season. From October 20, 1955, through September 14, 1957, he appeared in the Broadway stage version of No Time for Sergeants, where he played two roles, listed on the playbill as a Corporal Manual Dexterity and A Preacher. In 1958, he made his movie debut with Andy Griffith in the film version of No Time for Sergeants, where he reprised his Broadway role, and played a high-strung Air Force test administrator whose routine is disrupted by the hijinks of a provincial new recruit.

The Andy Griffith Show 

In 1960, Andy Griffith was offered the opportunity to headline his own sitcom, The Andy Griffith Show (1960–1968). Knotts took the role of Barney Fife, the deputy—and originally cousin—of Sheriff Andy Taylor (portrayed by Griffith). Knotts' portrayal of the deputy on the popular show earned him five Emmy Awards for Best Supporting Actor in a Television Comedy.

A summary of the show from the website of the Museum of Broadcast Communications describes Deputy Barney Fife:

When the show first aired, Griffith was intended to be the comedic lead with Knotts as his straight man, similar to their roles in No Time for Sergeants. However, it was quickly discovered that the show was funnier with the roles reversed. As Griffith maintained in several interviews, "By the second episode, I knew that Don should be funny, and I should play straight."

Knotts believed remarks by Griffith that The Andy Griffith Show would end after five seasons, and he began to look for other work, signing a five-film contract with Universal Studios. In his autobiography, Knotts admitted that he had not yet signed the contract when Griffith announced his decision to continue the series; but he had made up his mind to move on, believing he would not get the chance again. Knotts left the series in 1965. His character's absence on the show was explained by Deputy Fife's having finally made the "big time," joining the Raleigh, North Carolina, police force.

Post-Mayberry film career 

Knotts went on to star in a series of film comedies that drew on his high-strung persona from the television series: he had a cameo appearance in United Artists' It's a Mad, Mad, Mad, Mad World (1963), and starred in Warner Bros.' The Incredible Mr. Limpet (1964). Knotts then began his Universal five-film contract with The Ghost and Mr. Chicken (1966), The Reluctant Astronaut (1967), The Shakiest Gun in the West (1968), The Love God? (1969) and How to Frame a Figg (1971). After making How to Frame a Figg, Knotts' five-film contract with Universal finished.

Knotts reprised his role as Barney Fife several times in the 1960s: he made five guest appearances on The Andy Griffith Show (gaining him another two Emmy Awards), and he later appeared once on the spin-off Mayberry R.F.D., where he was present as best man for the marriage of Andy Taylor and his longtime love, Helen Crump. He continued to work steadily, though he did not appear as a regular on any successful television series until in 1979 he got the part of landlord Ralph Furley on Three's Company for seasons 4 through 8, after the departure of Norman Fell, who had played the previous landlord.

In the late 1960s and early 1970s, Knotts served as the spokesman for Dodge trucks and was featured prominently in a series of print ads and dealer brochures. On television, he went on to host a variety show/sitcom hybrid on NBC, The Don Knotts Show, which aired Tuesdays during the fall of 1970, but the series was low-rated and short-lived, and Knotts was uncomfortable with the variety show format. He also made frequent guest appearances on other shows such as The Bill Cosby Show and Here's Lucy. In 1970, he appeared as a Barney Fife-like police officer in the pilot of The New Andy Griffith Show. In 1972, Knotts voiced an animated version of himself in two episodes of The New Scooby Doo Movies: "The Spooky Fog of Juneberry", in which he played a lawman resembling Barney Fife, and "Guess Who's Knott Coming to Dinner". He appeared as Felix Unger in a stage version of Neil Simon's The Odd Couple, with Art Carney as Oscar Madison, and toured in the Neil Simon comedy Last of the Red Hot Lovers.

Beginning in 1975, Knotts was teamed with Tim Conway in a series of slapstick films aimed at children, including the Disney film The Apple Dumpling Gang (1975) and its sequel, The Apple Dumpling Gang Rides Again (1979). They also did two independent films, the boxing comedy The Prize Fighter (1979), and the mystery-comedy The Private Eyes (1980). Knotts co-starred in several other Disney films, including Gus (1976), No Deposit, No Return (1976), Herbie Goes to Monte Carlo (1977) and Hot Lead and Cold Feet (1978).

Three's Company 
In 1979, Knotts returned to series television in his second most identifiable role, the wacky but lovable landlord Ralph Furley on Three's Company. The series, which was already an established hit, added Knotts to the cast when the original landlords, Stanley and Helen Roper (a married couple played by Norman Fell and Audra Lindley, respectively) left to star in their own short-lived spin-off series The Ropers.

On set, Knotts easily integrated himself into the already established cast who were, as John Ritter put it, "so scared" of Knotts because of his star status. When Suzanne Somers left the show after a contract dispute in 1981, the writers started giving the material meant for Somers's Chrissy to Knotts' Furley. Knotts remained on the series until it ended in 1984. The Three's Company script supervisor, Carol Summers, became Knotts' agent and often accompanied him to personal appearances.

Later years 
In 1986, Knotts reunited with Andy Griffith in the made-for-television film Return to Mayberry, reprising his Barney Fife role. In early 1987, he joined the cast of the first-run syndication comedy What a Country!, as Principal Bud McPherson, for its remaining 13 episodes. It was produced by Martin Rips and Joseph Staretski, who had previously worked on Three's Company.

In 1988, Knotts joined Andy Griffith on TV's Matlock, in the recurring role of pesky neighbor Les Calhoun, until 1992.

After that, his roles were sporadic, including a cameo appearance in the film Big Bully (1996) as the high school principal. In 1998, he had a small but pivotal role as a mysterious TV repairman in Pleasantville. That year, his hometown of Morgantown, West Virginia changed the name of the street formerly known as South University Avenue (U.S. Route 119) to Don Knotts Boulevard on "Don Knotts Day". Also that day, in honor of Knotts' role as Barney Fife, he was named an honorary deputy sheriff with the Monongalia County Sheriff's Department.

Knotts was recognized in 2000 with a star on the Hollywood Walk of Fame. He continued to act on stage, but much of his film and television work after 2000 was as voice talent. In 2002, he appeared again with Scooby-Doo in the video game Scooby-Doo! Night of 100 Frights. (He also spoofed his appearances on that show in various promotions for Cartoon Network, and in a parody on Robot Chicken, where he was teamed with Phyllis Diller.) In 2003, he teamed up again with Tim Conway to provide voices for the direct-to-video children's series Hermie and Friends, which continued until Knotts' death. In 2005, he was the voice of Mayor Turkey Lurkey in Chicken Little (2005), his first Disney movie since 1979. On September 12, 2003, he was in Kansas City, in a stage version of On Golden Pond, when he received a call from John Ritter's family telling him that his former Three's Company co-star had died of an aortic dissection that day. He and his co-stars attended the funeral four days later. Knotts had appeared with Ritter one final time earlier in 2003 in a cameo on 8 Simple Rules for Dating My Teenage Daughter, in an episode that paid homage to their earlier television series. Knotts was the last Three's Company star to work with Ritter.

During this period of time, macular degeneration in both eyes caused the otherwise robust Knotts to become virtually blind. His live appearances on television were few. In 2005, he parodied his Ralph Furley character while playing a Paul Young variation in a Desperate Housewives sketch on The 3rd Annual TV Land Awards. He parodied that part one final time in "Stone Cold Crazy", an episode of the sitcom That '70s Show, where he played the landlord. It was his last live-action television appearance. His final role was in Air Buddies (2006), a direct-to-video sequel to Air Bud, voicing the sheriff's deputy dog Sniffer.

Personal life 

Knotts's friend Al Checco said, "Don was somewhat of a ladies' man. He fancied himself something of a Frank Sinatra. The ladies loved him and he dated quite a bit." Knotts was married three times. His marriage to Kathryn Metz lasted from 1947 until their divorce in 1964, and he raised his daughter as a single parent. He married Loralee Czuchna in 1974 and they divorced in 1983. His third marriage was to Frances Yarborough, from 2002 until his death in 2006. From his first marriage, Knotts had a son, Thomas Knotts, and a daughter, actress Karen Knotts (born April 2, 1954).

Knotts struggled with hypochondria and macular degeneration. Betty Lynn, one of his co-stars on The Andy Griffith Show, described him as a "very quiet man. Very sweet. Nothing like Barney Fife." TV writer Mark Evanier called him "the most beloved person in all of show business".

Death 

Knotts died at age 81 on February 24, 2006, at the Cedars-Sinai Medical Center in Los Angeles from pulmonary and respiratory complications of pneumonia related to lung cancer. He underwent treatment at Cedars-Sinai Medical Center in the months before his death, but returned home after reportedly feeling better. He was buried at Westwood Memorial Park in Los Angeles.

Knotts' obituaries cited him as a major influence on other entertainers. In early 2011, his grave's plain granite headstone was replaced with a bronze plaque depicting several of his movie and television roles. A statue honoring him, created by Jamie Lester, was unveiled on July 23, 2016, in front of The Metropolitan Theatre on High Street in his hometown of Morgantown, West Virginia.

Filmography 
The following is Don Knotts' acting credits.

Film

Television

Video games

Bibliography 
• ISBN 9781572972100 Barney Fife and Other Characters I Have Known

Awards 
The following are accolades and honors Don Knotts received throughout his career.

References

Further reading 
 
 
 
 
 
 Klin, Richard. "Fife and Drum". Flagpole, 2006.

External links 

 
 
 
 
 The West Virginia & Regional History Center has a collection of materials related to the career or Don Knotts

20th-century American comedians
20th-century American male actors
21st-century American comedians
21st-century American male actors
1924 births
2006 deaths
American male comedians
American male film actors
American male soap opera actors
American male television actors
American male voice actors
United States Army personnel of World War II
American people of English descent
Burials at Westwood Village Memorial Park Cemetery
Deaths from lung cancer in California
Deaths from pneumonia in California
Disney people
Male actors from West Virginia
Military personnel from West Virginia
Morgantown High School alumni
Outstanding Performance by a Supporting Actor in a Comedy Series Primetime Emmy Award winners
People from Morgantown, West Virginia
United States Army soldiers
Ventriloquists
West Virginia University alumni